Xinsheng Subdistrict is a subdistrict in Hanjiang District, Yangzhou, Jiangsu, China. , it administers the following three residential neighborhoods and six villages: 
Lüyangxinyuan
Xinsheng Community
Xinyue Community
Yinhu Village
Shuangdun Village
Guoyuan Village
Daliu Village
Yinxiang Village
Qilidian Village

See also 
 List of township-level divisions of Jiangsu

References 

Township-level divisions of Jiangsu
Hanjiang District, Yangzhou